Wayne Thomas Carlisle (born 9 September 1979) is a former professional footballer who played as a midfielder. He is assistant manager of Rotherham United.

Carlisle was primarily a right-sided midfielder, however was able to play in a wide range of positions. He was capped by Northern Ireland at youth, under-21 level and B international.

Career
Carlisle was born in Lisburn, Northern Ireland. He began his career with then English Championship side Crystal Palace. Due to the club's financial troubles during the late 1990s, first-team opportunities became available for the then-young trainee. He made his league debut in February 1999 in Palace's 1–1 draw at home to Birmingham City. Carlisle featured in 46 first team league matches while at Selhurst Park, but when Simon Jordan stepped in to save the club, investments in more experienced and high-profile players limited Carlisle's chances.

In October 2001 Carlisle moved on loan to Swindon Town for three months, where he featured in 11 matches, scoring 2 goals. On 28 March 2002, Carlisle moved on a free transfer to League Two side Bristol Rovers. In his over two years at Memorial Stadium, Carlisle produced a scoring record of 14 goals in 71 matches, this despite the team struggling against relegation. With Rovers needing to cut costs, Carlisle, along with teammate Danny Boxall was placed on the transfer list in December 2003.

He was released by Rovers in May 2004 and joined then League Two side Leyton Orient on a two-year contract the following month. In the 2005–06 season, Carlisle was restricted to mostly appearances from the bench, and transferred to Conference National side Exeter City in the January transfer window.

Carlisle started promisingly with his new club, breaking straight into the first team, but his season was ended prematurely with a broken leg suffered against Tamworth. At the end of the season, departing manager Alex Inglethorpe released Carlisle on a free transfer.

On 6 October 2006, Carlisle was re-signed by new Exeter City manager Paul Tisdale after impressing as an early season trialist. Carlisle was taken to hospital on 19 October 2006 to have his appendix removed. He broke back into the Exeter City first team, was offered an extended contract, and was involved in their promotion to the Football League in 2008, scoring in both of the play-off semi-final games against local rivals Torquay United.

Although offered a contract by Exeter, Carlisle chose to join Torquay United in May 2008, where on his third visit to the new Wembley in three years Carlisle gained his second consecutive promotion. Carlisle started the 2009–10 season in fine form but early in the new year sustained a knee injury which restricted him to on a handful of games before the end of the season. Carlisle signed a six-month contract with Torquay United at the start of the 2010–11 season but in January 2011 took the decision to retire from professional football to pursue a career in player development at Ivybridge Community College, Devon.

On 4 March 2011, Carlisle signed for Southern Premier League side Truro City but his spell there was short lived and in May 2011 he retired from playing football altogether to focus on a career in coaching.

Coaching career
In March 2017, Carlisle returned to former club Exeter City in the role of head of coaching to ensure coaching consistency at all age groups. Following the departure of Eric Kinder in the summer of 2019, Carlisle was promoted to the role of assistant manager. The 2021–22 season saw Carlisle and manager Matt Taylor lead Exeter to promotion from League Two with a second-placed finish.

On 4 October 2022, Carlisle followed manager Taylor as assistant manager to EFL Championship side Rotherham United on a contract until 2026.

References

External links

1979 births
Living people
Association footballers from Northern Ireland
Northern Ireland under-21 international footballers
Crystal Palace F.C. players
Swindon Town F.C. players
Bristol Rovers F.C. players
Leyton Orient F.C. players
Exeter City F.C. players
Torquay United F.C. players
Truro City F.C. players
English Football League players
Association football midfielders
Sportspeople from Lisburn
Exeter City F.C. non-playing staff
Rotherham United F.C. non-playing staff